In algebra, the first and second fundamental theorems of invariant theory concern the generators and the relations of the ring of invariants in the ring of polynomial functions for classical groups (roughly the first concerns the generators and the second the relations). The theorems are among the most important results of invariant theory.

Classically the theorems are proved over the complex numbers. But characteristic-free invariant theory extends the theorems to a field of arbitrary characteristic.

First fundamental theorem 

Second fundamental theorem for general linear group 
Let V, W be finite dimensional vector spaces over the complex numbers.

generated by the determinants of all the -minors.

Notes

References

Further reading 
Ch. II, § 4. of E. Arbarello, M. Cornalba, P.A. Griffiths, and J. Harris, Geometry of algebraic curves. Vol. I, Grundlehren der Mathematischen Wissenschaften, vol. 267, Springer-Verlag, New York, 1985. MR0770932

Hanspeter Kraft and Claudio Procesi, Classical Invariant Theory, a Primer

Algebra